The Flat is a 1968 Czech surrealist short film directed by Jan Švankmajer. The film features no dialogue, only music by Zdeněk Liška.

Plot
A man gets trapped in an old apartment. Objects in the apartment revolt against him and he isn't able to use them. A man with a rooster enters the apartment and hands him an axe. He destroys the door with the axe only to find a white wall with names written on it. He adds his name on the wall.

Cast
 Ivan Kraus as Josef
 Juraj Herz as man with a rooster

References

External links
 
 

1968 films
1968 short films
Surrealist films
Czechoslovak short films
Czech short films
Short films with live action and animation
Films directed by Jan Švankmajer
Films set in apartment buildings
1960s Czech films